Carmen Lucila Crexell (born 10 August 1972) is an Argentine politician, currently serving as a National Senator for Neuquén Province since 2013. She is a member of the Neuquén People's Movement (MPN).

Early life and education
Crexell was born on 10 August 1972 in Bahía Blanca, Buenos Aires Province, and grew up in San Martín de los Andes. Her father was Guillermo Crexell, a businessman, and her mother was Luz María Sapag, a politician and scion of the Sapag family, one of Neuquén's most important political families.

Luz Sapag was also a Senator for Neuquén from 2001 to 2007, as was Crexell's grandfather, Elías Sapag. Guillermo Crexell was murdered in 1995 by two of his employees, while Luz died in 2010 in a car accident.

Crexell studied Public Relations at the Argentine University of Enterprise, graduating in 2001. She also completed a law degree from the same university in 2019.

Political career
In 2008, Crexell was elected to the Constitutional Convention of San Martín de los Andes, tasked with drafting a new constitutional document for the municipality. Later, in 2011, she ran for the mayorality for the Neuquén People's Movement (MPN). Although she won in the MPN primaries, she was defeated by the Justicialist Party candidate.

Ahead of the 2013 legislative election, she was invited by Guillermo Pereyra (secretary general of the Private Oil and Gas Union of Río Negro, Neuquén and La Pampa) to be the second candidate in his MPN list to the Argentine Senate. The Pereyra-Crexell ticket won in the primaries against the Pechen-Bertoya ticket, supported by Crexell's cousin, then-Neuquén governor Jorge Sapag. The MPN went on to win the most votes in the general election, allowing Crexell to be elected into the Senate.

In preparation for the 2019 general election, Crexell joined Juntos por el Cambio and agreed to be the second candidate in the JxC list, behind Horacio "Pechi" Quiroga. However, Quiroga died on 12 October 2019, just a week before election day. Although with 32.3% of the vote, Juntos por el Cambio did not receive enough votes to secure the two Senate seats, as Quiroga was dead, Crexell renewed her seat in his stead. Despite being elected for Juntos por el Cambio, Crexell remained nominally a member of the MPN, and currently leads the single-member Neuquén People's Movement bloc in the Senate.

Crexell is one of two members of the Sapag family currently serving in the National Congress of Argentina, alongside Silvia Sapag.

References

External links
Profile on the official website of the Senate (in Spanish)

1972 births
Living people
People from Bahía Blanca
Sapag family
Members of the Argentine Senate for Neuquén
Women members of the Argentine Senate
Neuquén People's Movement politicians
21st-century Argentine politicians
21st-century Argentine women politicians